Exponential shift may refer to:

Exponential shift theorem, a shift theorem about polynomial differential operators and exponential function in mathematics
Exponent shift, a display function in engineering or scientific notation on some calculators